Rushen Coatie or Rashin-Coatie is a Scottish fairy tale collected by Joseph Jacobs in his More English Fairy Tales.

It is Aarne–Thompson type 510A, the persecuted heroine, as is Cinderella.

Synopsis

A queen with a daughter died. On her deathbed, she told her daughter that a red calf would come to her, and she could ask it for help.

The king remarried to a widow with three daughters, and the girl's stepmother and three stepsisters maltreated her, giving her only a coat made of rushes to wear—calling her Rushen Coatie— and gave her too little food. A red calf came to her, and when she asked for food, it told her to pull it from its ears. The stepmother set one of her daughters to spy on Rushen Coatie, and the girl discovered the red calf.

The stepmother feigned illness and told the king that she needed the sweetbread from the red calf. The king had it slaughtered, but the dead calf told Rushen Coatie to bury its body, and she did, except for the shankbone, which she could not find.

At Yuletide, the stepmother and stepsisters jeered at her for wanting to go to church and set her to make dinner, but the red calf limped into the kitchen.  It gave her clothing to wear and told her a charm to cook the supper.  At church, a young prince fell in love with her.

She went twice more, and the third time, the prince set a watch to stop her, but she jumped over it and a shoe made of glass fell to the ground.

The prince declared he would marry the woman whose foot the shoe matched, and one of her stepsisters hacked off part of her foot to do it, but the blood gave her away.  Then no one had failed to try except Rushen Coatie, so the prince insisted on her trying it, and they married, But soon after it was the end of their marriage.

See also
Bawang Putih Bawang Merah
Cap O' Rushes
Cinderella
Katie Woodencloak
One-Eye, Two-Eyes, and Three-Eyes
The Golden Slipper
The Sharp Grey Sheep
Vasilissa the Beautiful

External links

Scottish fairy tales
Fictional princesses
Scottish folklore
Female characters in fairy tales
ATU 500-559
Joseph Jacobs